Clannad 2 is the second studio album by Irish folk group Clannad, released in 1974 on Gael Linn Records.

Track listing
 "An Gabhar Bán (The White Goat)" – 3:15
 "Eleanor Plunkett" (Turlough O'Carolan) – 2:49
 "Coinleach Ghlas an Fhómhair" – 5:46
 "Rince Philib a' Cheoil" – 1:51
 "By Chance It Was" – 5:41
 "Rince Briotánach" – 3:14
 "Dhéanainn Súgradh" – 5:39
 "Gaoth Barra na dTonn" – 2:33
 "Teidhir Abhaile Riú" – 2:48
 "Fairly Shot of Her" – 2:21
 "Chuaigh Mé 'na Rosann" – 6:18

Singles
 "Dhéanainn Súgradh"

Personnel

Band
 Ciarán Ó Braonáin – bass, guitar, keyboards, vocals
 Máire Ní Bhronáin – vocals, harp
 Pól Ó Braonáin – flute, guitar, percussion, vocals
 Noel Ó Dúgáin – guitar, vocals
 Pádraig Ó Dúgáin – guitar, mandolin, vocals

Additional musicians
 Robbie Ó Braonáin – drums
 Tríona Ní Dhomhnaill – keyboards
 Mícheál Ó Domhnaill – guitar, vocals
 Dónal Lunny – synthesizer, guitar, percussion
 Pádraig Ó Domhnaill – Vocals

Production
 Philip Begley – engineer
 Bill Bolger – sleeve design
 Bill Giolando – mastering

External links
 This album at Northern Skyline

Notes

1975 albums
Clannad albums